The Auckland Ferry Terminal, also called the Downtown Ferry Terminal, is the hub of the Auckland ferry network, which connects the Auckland CBD with suburbs in North Shore, West Auckland, and South Auckland, and islands in the Hauraki Gulf. The terminal is on the Auckland waterfront, at the north end of Queen Street, across Quay Street from the Britomart Transport Centre, which is the hub for local buses and trains.

The ferry terminal is composed of two main elements, a yellow Edwardian Baroque building facing Queen Street and the CBD, and newer wharves and a waiting area building (the actual ferry terminal of today) facing the Waitematā Harbour.

Facilities

Edwardian building 
By the early 20th century, the Auckland Harbour Board recognised the need for a dedicated ferry building in Auckland. Original plans were for a five-storey structure, but after public outrage at the height, a design of four storeys and a clock tower was proposed. The plan was similar to that of the San Francisco Ferry Building. The building was designed by Alex Wiseman, and erected by Philcox and Sons. It was completed in 1912, of sandstone and brick with a base of Coromandel granite, on reclaimed land. It cost £67,944, a large sum for the day, equivalent to NZ$10.9 million in 2016.

The ferry building was the major departure point for people travelling to the North Shore until 1959, when the Auckland Harbour Bridge was opened.

A new ferry building was built next to it in 1982 and a report released that year said that extensive renovations were needed to bring the Edwardian building up to earthquake and fire code standards. The Harbour Board were divided over whether to keep the building, but following strong public opinion decided to renovate it. It has had a Category I classification with the New Zealand Historic Places Trust (now Heritage New Zealand) since 1982. It was extensively restored from 1986 and reopened by the Governor General on 5 November 1988. It now contains shops and cafes on the lower level, with most ferry operations moved to the new building.

New building 

The more contemporary ferry piers and waiting area were constructed mostly as an open-sided structure with a curved seagull/sail-roof, which together with ornamental "smokestack" turrets is designed to evoke ships berthed behind the original building. It also needed to be of a low profile to retain building views, and was designed by architect Murray Day to be easily maintainable and expandable.

Major remedial work 
Between 2009 and 2010, Auckland Regional Transport Authority carried out major remedial work on the wharf structure, which had not had such work done since construction. The initial works found some parts of the structure in worse shape than expected, as saltwater had slowly infiltrated the reinforced concrete. Initial urgent works were expected to finish in 2009.

References

External links 

 Photographs of the Auckland Ferry Terminal held in Auckland Libraries' heritage collections.

Buildings and structures in Auckland
Ferry Terminal
Public transport in Auckland
Transport infrastructure completed in 1912
Ferry terminals
1912 establishments in New Zealand
1910s architecture in New Zealand
Transport buildings and structures in the Auckland Region
Auckland CBD
Auckland waterfront
Waitematā Harbour